Thomas Lea (2 September 1890–1979) was an English footballer who played in the Football League for Bristol Rovers and Wolverhampton Wanderers. He played in the 1921 FA Cup Final as Wolves lost 1–0 to Tottenham Hotspur.

References

1890 births
1979 deaths
English footballers
Association football midfielders
English Football League players
Whitchurch F.C. players
Chester City F.C. players
Wolverhampton Wanderers F.C. players
Bristol Rovers F.C. players
Shrewsbury Town F.C. players
FA Cup Final players